The 1846 State of the Union Address was presented to the 29th United States Congress, containing both the United States Senate and United States House of Representatives on Tuesday, December 8, 1846. It was the 56th address given. President James K. Polk, the 11th president, had written it. It was written during the Mexican–American War, and addresses it. "The existing war with Mexico was neither desired nor provoked by the United States."

References

Presidency of James K. Polk
State of the Union addresses
29th United States Congress
State of the Union Address
State of the Union Address
State of the Union Address
State of the Union Address
December 1846 events
State of the Union